This is a list of palaces and mansions in Csongrád County in Hungary.

List of palaces and mansions in Csongrád County

See also
 List of palaces and mansions in Hungary
 List of castles in Hungary

Literature
 Zsolt Virág : Magyar kastélylexikon 3. Csongrád megye kastélyai és kúriái (Castellum Novum, 2002)

References

Csongrád County
Houses in Hungary